

Uostadvaris Lighthouse is a lighthouse located 12 kilometres north of Rusnė, in Lithuania. The lighthouse is located on southern side of the Atmata River, one of the mouths of the Nemunas Delta, on the coast of the Curonian Spit.

The lighthouse was constructed in 1876. It is an octagonal red-brick tower, attached by a passage to the lighthouse keeper's building. The lighthouse was deactivated in 1986.

See also

 List of lighthouses in Lithuania

References

Lighthouses completed in 1876
Resort architecture in Lithuania
Lighthouses in Lithuania